Royal Air Force Metfield or more simply RAF Metfield is a former Royal Air Force station located just to the southeast of the village of Metfield, Suffolk, England.

Metfield was built as a standard, Class-A bomber design airfield, consisting of three intersecting concrete runways, fifty dispersal points and two T-2 type hangars.   Additional buildings were also erected to house about 2,900 personnel on former farmland to the southwest.  When it was constructed in 1943, it necessitated the closure of the B1123 road between Halesworth and Harleston.

History

USAAF use
The airfield was built for the United States Army Air Forces (USAAF) Eighth Air Force as a heavy bomber field.  During the Second World War it was known as USAAF Station 366.  Metfield was one of the most isolated Eighth Air Force stations in Suffolk.

353rd Fighter Group
The first American occupants of Metfield was the 353rd Fighter Group, moving in from RAF Goxhill on 3 August 1943.  The 353rd was assigned to the 66th Fighter Wing, at Sawston Hall, Cambridge.

Operational squadrons of the 353d were:
 350th Fighter Squadron (LH)
 351st Fighter Squadron (YJ)
 352nd Fighter Squadron (SX)

Group markings were black, yellow, black, yellow spinners, with a 48-inch black and yellow check band around the cowling to the end of the exhaust stubs.

Equipped with Republic P-47D Thunderbolts, operations commenced on 12 August 1943.  It was the fourth P-47 unit to join the Eighth Air Force.   From Metfield the 353rd flew numerous counter-air missions and provided escort for bombers that attacked targets in western Europe, made counter-air sweeps over France and the Low Countries, and dive-bombed targets in France.

On 12 April 1944 the 353rd moved to RAF Raydon.

491st Bombardment Group (Heavy)
With the departure of the P-47's of the 353d, a Consolidated B-24 Liberators bombardment group, the 491st Bombardment Group (Heavy) moved in.  The 491st starting arriving on 15 May and the last aircraft arrived on 30 May 1944.

The 491st was assigned to the 95th Combat Wing at RAF Halesworth.  The group tail code was a Circle "Z". Its operational squadrons were:
 852nd Bombardment Squadron (3Q)
 853rd Bombardment Squadron (T8)
 854th Bombardment Squadron (6X)
 855th Bombardment Squadron (V2)

The squadrons were unusual in it having its ground complement recruited from other stations of the 2nd Air Division.  The group commenced operations on 2 June 1944.

The 491st attacked airfields, bridges, and coastal defenses both preceding and during the invasion of Normandy.   After D-Day, the unit concentrated its attacks on strategic objectives in Germany, striking communications centers, oil refineries, storage depots, industrial areas, shipyards, and other targets in such places as Berlin, Hamburg, Kassel, Cologne, Gelsenkirchen, Bielefeld, Hannover, and Magdeburg.

On one occasion the 491st attacked the headquarters of the German General Staff at Zossen, Germany.

On 15 August 1944, the 95th Combat wing was broken up and the 491st was moved to RAF North Pickenham.

1409th Army Air Force Base Unit
After the 491st moved, a small number of B-24's were still assigned to Metfield, under the command of the European Division of Air Transport, United States Strategic Air Forces in Europe (USSTAF).  These aircraft were used by the 1409th Army Air Force Base Unit, a classified unit engaged in clandestine transport operations to Sweden, flying out special materials and ferrying personnel.

The 1409th operated from Metfield until the end of the war operating the B-24s, as well as Douglas C-47 Skytrains and Douglas C-54 Skymasters.  The unit also used RAF Leuchars in Scotland as an advanced base.

On 4 March 1945 during "Operation Gisela" RAF Metfield was strafed by a Junkers Ju 88(G-6) of the Luftwaffe, killing one man in the control tower.  The aircraft crashed just south of the airfield, after attempting to attack an inbound B24, with its upward firing cannon.

Metfield explosion
On 15 July 1944 at 7:30pm there was a major explosion at the Metfield bomb dump. Some soldiers from the 2218th Quartermaster Truck Company arrived to deliver the bombs. When they arrived they were impatient to discover that soldiers at the dump who operated the hoist were on a meal break, and decided to unload the bombs without the crane. However these bombs were more sensitive than previous munitions: when they used a previously successful technique to drop the bombs off the back of the truck, one bomb landed on another and they both exploded. A chain reaction led to 1,200 tons of high-explosive and incendiary bombs exploding, shaking the countryside for a radius of several miles. Six men were killed. Three soldiers, Privates Donald P. Adkins, Donald L. Hurley and Steve W. Suchey are memorialised at Cambridge American Cemetery as missing in action. 5 B-24's in nearby hardstands were severely damaged beyond repair. An additional six aircraft were severely damaged. There is an eyewitness account of being blown flat 3.5 miles away from the explosion.

After the explosion, an extended loop road was built to by-pass the crater left by the explosion.  The crater subsequently became a dump for all manner of discarded items.

Royal Air Force use

In May 1945, RAF Metfield was closed and returned to the RAF.  It was subsequently abandoned, but remained in the hands of the Air Ministry.

Current use

Metfield was not used by the Air Ministry after the Second World War ended and for years it sat abandoned and empty.  In 1964 and 1965, the airfield and support buildings were sold to private individuals.

Metfield was returned to agricultural use; however, the site of the bomb dump explosion could be seen for many years as a water-filled lake.

When the lake was cleaned out, all types of discarded equipment was found, including several unexploded bombs.   Indeed, ordnance that was tossed into the air during the bomb dump explosion has been found over the years in the fields surrounding Metfield.  Pieces of metal from the exploded bombs has been found scattered over the area to the present day.

In the late 1960s the main runways, taxiways and parking aprons were mostly torn up or turned into single lane agricultural roads.

Sadly, very little evidence of the airfield can be seen today. Only a few brick buildings, deteriorating Quonset (Nissen) huts, and some concrete aircraft taxiways remain.

See also

List of former Royal Air Force stations

References

Citations

Bibliography

 Freeman, Roger A. (1991) The Mighty Eighth The Colour Record. Cassell & Co. 

 USAAS-USAAC-USAAF-USAF Aircraft Serial Numbers—1908 to present

External links

 491st Bombardment Group website
 United States Army Air Forces - Metfield
 Historic Metfield photo gallery
 Photographs of RAF Metfeld from the Geograph British Isles project

Metfeld
Airfields of the VIII Bomber Command in Suffolk